Hickory Flat is a town in Benton County, Mississippi, United States. The population was 601 at the 2010 census.

History
Hickory Flat was named from a nearby grove of hickory trees.

Geography
Hickory Flat is located at  (34.6159, -89.1884). U.S. Route 78, a freeway, serves the town via Exit 48. Mississippi Highway 178, following the former route of US 78, runs through the center of the town.

Demographics

2020 census

As of the 2020 United States census, there were 496 people, 234 households, and 146 families residing in the town.

2000 census
As of the census of 2000, there were 565 people, 221 households, and 161 families residing in the town. The population density was 611.5 people per square mile (237.1/km2). There were 242 housing units at an average density of 261.9 per square mile (101.6/km2). The racial makeup of the town was 86.19% White, 12.74% African American, 0.71% Native American, and 0.35% from two or more races. Hispanic or Latino of any race were 0.18% of the population.

There were 221 households, out of which 37.6% had children under the age of 18 living with them, 54.8% were married couples living together, 13.6% had a female householder with no husband present, and 27.1% were non-families. 25.3% of all households were made up of individuals, and 13.6% had someone living alone who was 65 years of age or older. The average household size was 2.56 and the average family size was 3.06.

In the town, the population was spread out, with 29.2% under the age of 18, 12.4% from 18 to 24, 27.1% from 25 to 44, 17.7% from 45 to 64, and 13.6% who were 65 years of age or older. The median age was 31 years. For every 100 females there were 78.8 males. For every 100 females age 18 and over, there were 76.2 males.

The median income for a household in the town was $24,141, and the median income for a family was $30,385. Males had a median income of $27,321 versus $18,438 for females. The per capita income for the town was $12,392. About 18.4% of families and 17.4% of the population were below the poverty line, including 16.2% of those under age 18 and 10.7% of those age 65 or over.

Education
Hickory Flat is served by the Benton County School District.

Climate
The climate in this area is characterized by hot, humid summers and generally mild to cool winters.  According to the Köppen Climate Classification system, Hickory Flat has a humid subtropical climate, abbreviated "Cfa" on climate maps.

Notable native
Elder Roma Wilson, gospel singer and harmonicist.

References

Towns in Benton County, Mississippi
Towns in Mississippi